Kitfo, is an Ethiopian traditional dish which originated among the Gurage people. It consists of minced raw beef, marinated in mitmita (a chili powder-based spice blend) and niter kibbeh (a clarified butter infused with herbs and spices). The word comes from the Ethio-Semitic root k-t-f, meaning "to chop finely; mince."

Kitfo cooked lightly rare is known as kitfo leb leb. Kitfo is often served alongside—sometimes mixed with—a mild cheese called ayibe or cooked greens known as gomen. In many parts of Ethiopia, kitfo is served with injera, a spongy, absorbent sourdough crepe-style bread made from fermented teff flour, although in traditional Gurage cuisine, one would use kocho, a thick flatbread made from the ensete plant. An ensete leaf may be used as a garnish. Though not considered a delicacy, kitfo is generally held in high regard.

Kitfo is served on special occasions such as holidays; it is commonly used on the "Finding of the True Cross" or "Meskel" holiday celebrated annually on September 27 in Ethiopia.

See also
Gored gored
Steak tartare
Kibbeh nayyeh
Raw foodism
List of African dishes
List of Ethiopian dishes and foods

References

External links
Kitfo recipe

Raw beef dishes
Eritrean cuisine
Ethiopian cuisine